Fotudeng (Sanskrit: Buddhacinga?) (ca. 232–348 CE) was a Buddhist monk and missionary from Kucha. He studied in Kashmir and came to Luoyang in 310 CE, and was active in the spread of Buddhism in China.

Life

Early life, emigration to China, and association with Shi Le's Later Zhao dynasty
Fotudeng came from Central Asia to China in 310 CE and propagated Buddhism widely. He is said to have demonstrated many spiritual powers, and was able to convert the warlords in this region of China over to Buddhism. He succeeded in converting the Jie warlord Shi Le and became his closest advisor as he founded the Later Zhao dynasty in 319 CE. Fotudeng uttered the only phrase that reached us in the Jie language, cited in connection with Shi Le's successful war against Liu Yao of Former Zhao in 328 CE, and recorded in the Chinese annals in Chinese transcription with a Chinese translation. This phrase was analyzed in several publications.

As a teacher of meditation
Fotudeng is well known for teaching methods of meditation, and especially ānāpānasmṛti ("mindfulness of breathing"). Fotudeng widely taught ānāpānasmṛti through methods of counting breaths, so as to temper to the breathing, simultaneously focusing the mind into a state of peaceful meditative concentration (Skt. samādhi). By teaching meditation methods as well as doctrine, Fotudeng popularized Buddhism quickly. According to Nan Huai-Chin, "Besides all its theoretical accounts of emptiness and existence, Buddhism also offered methods for genuine realization of spiritual powers and meditative concentration that could be relied upon. This is the reason that Buddhism began to develop so vigorously in China with Fotudeng."

Legacy and successors
Eventually Fotudeng became a Later Zhao government official under Shi Hu, who allowed him to found a great number of Buddhist temples. Among his disciples were Dao An, Zhu Faya, Zhu Fatai, Fa-he and Fa-ch'ang. These disciples had a great impact on Buddhism in China, and continued to revere the memory of their teacher. In his history of China, John Keay writes:

See also
 Silk Road transmission of Buddhism
 Buddhism in Central Asia

References

External links
 https://web.archive.org/web/20090508035159/http://www12.canvas.ne.jp/horai/masters-index.htm

3rd-century Buddhist monks
4th-century Buddhist monks
Jin dynasty (266–420) Buddhists
Later Zhao Buddhists
230s births
348 deaths
Year of birth uncertain
Chinese Buddhist missionaries
Buddhist monks from the Western Regions